Ultraviolet-sensitive beads (UV beads) are beads that are colorful in the presence of ultraviolet radiation.  Ultraviolet rays are present in sunlight and light from various artificial sources and can cause sunburn or skin cancer.  The color change in the beads alerts the wearer to the presence of the radiation.

When changing colour they undergo photochromism.

When the beads are not exposed to ultraviolet rays, they are colorless and either translucent or opaque. However, when sunlight falls onto the beads, they instantly turn into red, orange, yellow, blue, purple, or pink.

References

External links
 Description of ultraviolet-sensitive beads and related products

Beadwork
Craft materials
Jewellery components
Ultraviolet radiation